Embassy of Lithuania in Washington, D.C., is the diplomatic mission of the Republic of Lithuania to the United States. It is located at 2622 16th Street Northwest, Washington, D.C., in the Adams Morgan neighborhood.

Building
The building was designed by architect George Oakley Totten, Jr. It was built in 1909 by Senator John B. Henderson and his wife Mary Foote Henderson. In 1924, Lithuania bought the building for $90,000. It was damaged when a bomb was detonated at the next-door Cuban Interests Section on May 19, 1979. At the time the building was occupied by the Lithuanian diplomatic service acting in conditions of exile. Its meager budget did not allow for extensive repairs. Therefore, Stasys Antanas Bačkis organized a fundraising campaign among Lithuanian Americans and collected about $130,000. The repairs and much needed reconstruction was carried out in 1981–1983.

History

After World War I, Lithuania regained independence from the Russian Empire and opened legations to establish independent diplomatic representation. At the time, the legation was the standard form of diplomatic mission, and only Great Powers established embassies in each other's capitals. Although Lithuania was occupied and incorporated into the Soviet Union in 1940, its prewar government had instructed its diplomats to maintain an independent presence in exile. After the war, the embassy became the standard form of diplomatic representation, but Lithuania could not receive a U.S. Ambassador since its territory was occupied by the Soviet Union. By 1990, the Baltic legations were the last remaining legations in Washington, D.C. In 1991, an independent Lithuania finally upgraded its legation to an embassy.

Ambassadors
The ambassador of Lithuania in Washington, D.C. is the representative of the Lithuanian government for the US government.

See also
 Lithuania – United States relations

References

External links

 Official website
 wikimapia

Lithuania
Washington, D.C.
Lithuania–United States relations
Adams Morgan
 
United States
Lithuania